Yuriy Andriyovych Mozharovskyi (Ukrainian: Юрій Андрійович Можаровський; born 2 October 1976, in Lviv, Ukraine) is a Ukrainian professional football referee. He has been a full international for FIFA since 2011.

References

External links
 
 
 Yuriy Mozharovskiy referee profile at allplayers.in.ua

1976 births
Living people
Sportspeople from Lviv
Lviv State University of Physical Culture alumni
Ukrainian football referees
Academic staff of the University of Lviv